In United States aviation, a terminal radar service area (TRSA) is a delimited airspace where radar and air traffic control services are made available to pilots flying under instrument flight rules or (optionally) visual flight rules, to maintain aircraft separation.

TRSAs most often surround busy U.S. airports.  In recent years, many of them have been replaced by Class C or Class B airspace.

Terminal Radar Service Area was established as part of a program to create terminal radar stations at selected airports. Because they were not subject to the rulemaking process of 14 CFR Part 91, they do not fit into any existing U.S. classifications of airspace, and have been classified as non-part 71 airspaces. While operating in these airspaces, pilots who choose to participate receive radar services, but participation is not required for VFR operations.

TRSAs encompass a primary airport with a class "D" designation, with the TRSA above other controlled airspace (Typically Class E Airspace) with a typical floor of 700 feet or 1,200 feet AGL (Above Ground Level).

TRSAs are shown on most VFR (Visual Flight Rules) sectional charts as solid grey with black text.

List of Terminal Radar Service Areas (TRSAs) in the United States

See also 

 List of Class C airports in the United States
 List of Class B airports in the United States

References 
Sectional chart example of the Palm Springs, California TRSA
Federal Aviation Administration > Pilot's Handbook of Aeronautical Knowledge, Chapter 14: Airspace 
Federal Aviation Administration > Aeronautical Information Manual, Paragraph 3-5-6

Air traffic control
Lists of airports in the United States